The 1977–78 Iowa Hawkeyes men's basketball team represented the University of Iowa as members of the Big Ten Conference. The team was led by head coach Lute Olson, coaching in his 4th season at the school, and played their home games at the Iowa Field House. They finished the season 12–15 overall and 5–13 in Big Ten play.

Roster

Schedule/results

|-
!colspan=8| Non-Conference Regular Season
|-

|-
!colspan=8| Big Ten Conference Season
|-

Rankings

References

Iowa
Iowa Hawkeyes men's basketball seasons
Hawkeyes
Hawkeyes